Sherbrooke was an electoral district of the Legislative Assembly in the Australian colony (and state from 1901) of New South Wales, existing from 1894 until 1913. It included Blacktown and Baulkham Hills. It was named after Robert Lowe, 1st Viscount Sherbrooke.

Members for Sherbrooke

History
Multi-member constituencies were abolished in the 1893 redistribution, resulting in the creation of 76 new districts, including Sherbrooke. Sherbrooke consisted of the north western part of the four member district of Central Cumberland, a south eastern part of the single member district of The Hawkesbury and an eastern part of the single member district of The Nepean.

Sherbrooke was expanded to include part of The Hawkesbury and parts of the abolished districts of The Nepean and Ryde and Willoughby as a result of the 1903 New South Wales referendum which reduced the number of members of the Legislative Assembly from 125 to 90. The district was abolished in 1913.

Election results

References

Former electoral districts of New South Wales
Constituencies established in 1894
1894 establishments in Australia
Constituencies disestablished in 1913
1913 disestablishments in Australia